The Six Schools of Nara Buddhism, also known as the Rokushū 六宗 (also Rokushuu/Rokushu), were academic Buddhist sects. These schools came to Japan from Korea and China during the late 6th and early 7th centuries. All of these schools were controlled by the newly formed Japanese government of Nara. These schools were installed to mimic and expand upon already existing mainland Asian Buddhist thought.

The schools were installed during the reign of Prince Shōtoku, most likely to increase the power of the expanding government through Buddhist and Confucian doctrine. Because of the government involvement in religious expansion, government funds were used to construct grand temples, statues, and paintings, most notably the Seven Great Southern Temples of Nara. Most of these sects wanted to be the main Buddhist school of the Imperial House of Japan and high officials. Because of this, many of them tried to be appealing to nobility. Many of the themes of these schools delved on advanced level, complicated, almost cryptic, Indian philosophies on the mind and existence. Some of the schools, though, were ideas on the formation and operations of a vihara. Due to the location of the temples constructed for these schools they were also called, The Six Southern Schools of Nara Buddhism. Eventually the increasing power of these schools of Buddhism and their influence in politics started to overwhelm the city of Nara. This forced Emperor Kanmu to relocate the capital, moving it to Heian-kyō (Kyoto). It also directly encouraged the creation of the Tendai school, founded by Saichō, and Shingon Buddhism, founded by Kūkai.

All six schools shared Gautama Buddha's original teaching of the Four Noble Truths, but differed in their interpretations of ideas such as the interdependency of phenomena, ultimate enlightenment (nirvana), non-self (anātman), and the Middle Way.

These schools laid the groundwork for the development of Pure Land Buddhism and the emergence of the worship of a distinctly Japanese form of Amitābha, Amida.

The Six Schools (六宗)

  (Mahayana) - Also known as the Vijñānavāda, Cittamatra or Consciousness-only school, this sect studied on mastering the consciousness and mind. This is explained as the Indian idea of Yogacara that was intense drills on use of the mind.
  - This sect focused on the use of sutras in the abhidharma-style.
  (Mahayana): Originating as the Chinese Huayan school, this sect studied the Avataṃsaka Sūtra. These sutras theorized the unobstructed interpenetration of all phenomena, or that all ideas and things can be penetrated and collected into one mind.
  (Sarvastivada) - Also known as the "Dharma Analysis Treasury school", this sect studied the Abhidharma-kosa of Vasubandhu. It focused on abhidharma. This philosophy centers around the idea of that which the "self" is.
  (Dharmaguptaka) - This sect studied the teachings of the famous Chinese "Blind Monk" Jianzhen, who taught his followers to strictly observe the prātimokṣa and monastic ordination. They were not so focused on doctrine as they were on the moral structure of their monks and nuns.
  (Mahayana)- Also known as the "Three Treatise School", this sect studied the teachings of a Korean monk named Hyegwan. This school focused on three treatises that explained emptiness, mystical knowledge, and the reality of physical things. It displayed a less strict, rules orientated, path to Buddhism. This school was followed by Prince Shōtoku.

Seven Great Southern Temples of Nara, Nanto Shichidaiji (南都七大寺) 

Daian-ji (大安寺)
Gangō-ji (元興寺)
Hōryū-ji (法隆寺), located in the town of Ikaruga near present-day Nara.
Kōfuku-ji (興福寺)
Saidai-ji (西大寺)
Tōdai-ji (東大寺)
Yakushi-ji (薬師寺)

See also
 Buddhism in Japan
 Dharmaguptaka
 Schools of Buddhism
 Vinaya

References